The Italian Federation of Commerce, Hotel and Service Workers (FILCAMS) is a trade union representing workers in the service sector in Italy.

The union was founded in 1960, when the Italian Federation of Trade and Allied Workers merged with the Italian Federation of Hotel and Cafe Workers.  Like its predecessors, it affiliated to the Italian General Confederation of Labour.  By 1998, it had 235,337 members, of whom 40% worked in hospitality, and the remainder in commerce.

General Secretaries
1960: Alieto Cortesi
1972: Domenico Gotta
1981: Gilberto Pasucci
1991: Aldo Amoretti
1999: Ivano Corraini
2008: Francesco Martini
2015: Maria Grazia Gabrielli

External links

References

Retail trade unions
Trade unions established in 1960
Trade unions in Italy